The 38th Primetime Emmy Awards were presented on September 21, 1986, at the Pasadena Civic Auditorium in Pasadena, California. The Emmy ceremony was cohosted by David Letterman and Shelley Long.  During the ceremony, Letterman saluted Grant Tinker, who had stepped down as chairman of NBC due to its parent company, RCA, having been acquired by General Electric.  The ceremony was also memorable for the presentation of the Governors' Award to Red Skelton, presented by comedy legend Lucille Ball, who in his acceptance speech said he had missed being on TV for the previous 16 years.

This year's ceremony saw the return of the guest acting category. The top shows of the night were The Golden Girls which won Outstanding Comedy Series and two other major awards. The Golden Girls became the first series to gain three nominations in a lead acting category, they would repeat this feat multiple times. For the second straight year Cagney & Lacey won for Outstanding Drama Series, and led all shows with four major wins. With help from the guest acting category, The Cosby Show with 13 nominations broke the record for most major nominations by a comedy series of 11 set by The Mary Tyler Moore Show in 1977. This record has since been surpassed.

Winners and nominees

Programs

Acting

Lead performances

Supporting performances

Guest performances

Directing

Writing

Most major nominations
By network 
 NBC – 79
 CBS – 39
 ABC – 13

 By program
 The Cosby Show (NBC) - 13
 St. Elsewhere (NBC) – 10
 The Golden Girls (NBC) / Moonlighting (ABC) – 9
 An Early Frost (NBC) / Cheers (NBC) – 8
 Cagney & Lacey (CBS) – 7

Most major awards
By network 
 NBC – 17
 CBS – 9

 By program
 Cagney & Lacey (CBS) – 4
 The Golden Girls (NBC) / St. Elsewhere (NBC) – 3

Notes

References

External links
 Emmys.com list of 1986 Nominees & Winners
 

038
1986 television awards
1986 in California
September 1986 events in the United States